Rise Again: Tulsa and the Red Summer is a 2021 American documentary television film, directed and produced by Dawn Porter. It follows journalist DeNeen Brown who investigates the Tulsa race massacre in the search for mass graves, and new insights.

It was released on June 18, 2021, by National Geographic.

Synopsis
Journalist DeNeen Brown investigates the Tulsa race massacre, searching for mass graves and new insights into the Red Summer.

Production
In February 2021, it was announced Dawn Porter would direct and produce a documentary film revolving around the Tulsa race massacre, with National Geographic Documentary Films producing and distributing.

Release
It was released on June 18, 2021, by National Geographic.

Reception

Critical response 
Rise Again: Tulsa and the Red Summer received positive reviews from film critics. It holds a 100% approval rating on review aggregator website Rotten Tomatoes, based on 10 reviews, with a weighted average of 8.00/10.

Accolades

References

External links
 
 

2021 films
2021 television films
2021 documentary films
2020s English-language films
American documentary television films
National Geographic (American TV channel) original programming
2020s American films